This is a list of the military equipment of Sweden, including the army, air force and navy.

Army 
Utility vehicles: 11,308++

Armored personnel carriers: 1,267

Infantry fighting vehicles: 859

Tanks: 120 in active service

Towed artillery pieces: 220+ (mortars, all towed howitzers have been withdrawn from service)

Self-propelled artillery pieces: 48 155mm howitzers and 40  dual 120mm mortars

Small arms and light weapons

Utility vehicles

Armoured personnel carriers

Infantry fighting vehicles

Tanks

Artillery and mortars

Surface to air missiles

Navy

Corvettes

Minesweepers

Patrol boats

Submarines

Auxiliary vessels

Landing craft

School ships

Coast Guard ships
Even if the Swedish Coast Guard (Swedish: Kustbevakningen) is not officially a part of the navy, and operates under the Ministry of Justice (Swedish: Justitiedepartementet), its activities are coordinated with the Swedish Armed Forces in a number of areas.

The Coast Guard operate along the entire coastline of Sweden, with the mission to rescue, assist and monitor. The total number of vessels exceeds 100 whereof 25 are patrol boats dedicated to maritime surveillance.

In addition, the Coast Guard has three Dash 8 Q-300 aircraft for maritime surveillance.

Air force 

The airforce opperates a mulitude of different aircraft plattoforms, with JAS 39 Gripen C/D beeing the main airframe. The airforce also opperates C130H and Saab 340 in a transport role along with other aircraft types for other capabilieties and missions. 

In terms of helicopters in the swdish airforce bothe NH90 (HKP14) and UH60-M Blackhawk (HKP16) is beeing used, as well as AW-109 (HKP15) as a light helicopter.

In 2014 the Swedish air force ordered 60 Gripen E.

Combat aircraft 
The total number of combat aircraft and armed trainers in the Swedish air force is currently 217, and will in time be increased to 317-337.

Non-combat aircraft

Helicopters

Weapons and munitions

See also 
Military equipment of Sweden during World War II
Military equipment of Sweden during the Cold War
List of equipment of the Swedish Army

References

Sources and further reading 
 Home page of the Swedish Armed Forces
 http://www.soldf.com

Sweden
Swedish military-related lists
Military equipment of Sweden